The Kiss Quotient is a 2018 novel written by Helen Hoang. It follows Stella, an autistic woman who hires an escort in order to explore intimacy with other people.

Development 
Hoang wrote the first draft of what would become The Kiss Quotient within ten weeks. The manuscript went through several drafts before she entered the online pitch contest Pitch Wars, where she revised it again with the help of her mentor Brighton Walsh, working for eight months.

Hoang states that she initially wanted to write a gender-swapped Pretty Woman, but was stuck when examining why a "successful, beautiful woman would hire an escort." During a meeting with her daughter's preschool teacher, Hoang found out that her daughter is on the autism spectrum. She researched autism and realized that she, too, is autistic, and used that as the basis for the book's concept.

Reception
The Kiss Quotient received a positive review from Publishers Weekly. It had an initial print run of 100,000 copies.  the book was in its fourth printing.

In August 2018, it was announced that Pilgrim Media Group acquired the film, TV, and other media rights for The Kiss Quotient and partnered with Lionsgate for an expected domestic release.

A sequel titled The Bride Test was published by Berkley in May 2019. The novel is about Esme, a hotel maid who gets offered to accompany Khai to a wedding: Khai is the autistic cousin of Michael mentioned in The Kiss Quotient.  Hoang is working on the third book in the series, tentatively titled The Heart Principle.

References 

2018 American novels
American romance novels
Contemporary romance novels
Books about autism
Books about autistic women
Berkley Books books